The following is List of Universities and Colleges in Liaoning.

References
List of Chinese Higher Education Institutions — Ministry of Education
List of Chinese universities, including official links
Liaoning Institutions Admitting International Students

 
Liaoning